Amantis biroi is a species of praying mantis native to India, the Maluku Islands, Sulawesi, and the Sunda Islands.

References

biroi
Mantodea of Asia
Insects of India
Insects of Indonesia
Fauna of Sulawesi
Fauna of the Lesser Sunda Islands
Fauna of the Maluku Islands
Insects described in 1915